Bryonora is a genus of crustose lichens in the family Lecanoraceae. The genus was circumscribed in 1983 by lichenologist Josef Poelt, with Bryonora castanea assigned as the type species.

Species
Bryonora castanea 
Bryonora castaneoides 
Bryonora curvescens 
Bryonora granulata  – Falkland Islands
Bryonora microlepis  – Norway
Bryonora peltata  – Antarctica

References

Lecanoraceae
Lecanorales genera
Lichen genera
Taxa described in 1983
Taxa named by Josef Poelt